Madison Square Garden is a 1932 American Pre-Code drama film directed by Harry Joe Brown and written by Thomson Burtis, Allen Rivkin and P.J. Wolfson.

The film stars Jack Oakie, Thomas Meighan, Marian Nixon, William Collier, Sr., ZaSu Pitts, Lew Cody and William "Stage" Boyd. The film was released on November 4, 1932, by Paramount Pictures.
 
Actual boxers like Jack Johnson, Billy Papke and Tom Sharkey and actual sports journalists like Paul Gallico, Grantland Rice and Damon Runyon appear in the story as themselves.

Plot
Middleweight contender Eddie Burke needs to change managers after his, Doc Williams, sets up a big fight at Madison Square Garden for him. Eddie becomes distracted by too much partying and girlfriend Bee, who is understandably worried about him.

Eddie falls into the hands of a crooked trainer, "Honest John" Miller, who works for a racketeer, Sloane. He is made to lose the fight, Miller wrapping his opponent's hands in plaster, and takes a terrible beating. But when the truth comes to light, some of Eddie's fellow boxers go after the crooks with their fists.

Cast
Jack Oakie as Eddie Burke
Thomas Meighan as Bill Carley
Marian Nixon as Bee 
William Collier, Sr. as Doc Williams
ZaSu Pitts as Florrie
Lew Cody as Rourke
William "Stage" Boyd as Sloane
Warren Hymer as Brassie Randall
Robert Elliott as Honest John Miller
Joyce Compton as Joyce
Bert Gordon as Izzy
Noel Francis as himself 
Sailor Sharkey as himself
Tommy Ryan as himself
Wrestler Stanislaus Zbyszko as himself
Billy Papke as himself 
Mike Donlin (referee) as himself 
Tod Sloan as himself
Damon Runyon as himself
Grantland Rice as himself 
Jack Lait as himself 
Westbrook Pegler as himself 
Paul Gallico as himself
Jack Johnson (boxer) as himself  
Ed W. Smith as himself
Teddy Hayes as himself
Lou Magnolia as himself  
W. C. Robinson as himself

References

External links
 

1932 films
American drama films
1932 drama films
Paramount Pictures films
Films directed by Harry Joe Brown
American black-and-white films
1930s English-language films
1930s American films